The Idra, which means threshing floor in Aramaic, is a Kabbalistic work included in printings of the Zohar, and was probably written and appended to the main body of the Zohar at a later date.  Contemporary scholars believe the Idra dates to the third generation of Zoharic literature, which produced also the Tikunei haZohar, the Ra'aya Meheimna, and other Zoharic material.  The main body of the Zohar, or guf ha-zohar, dates to the second generation of Zoharic material.

There are actually two texts in Zoharic literature called Idra: the first being the Idra Rabba, or "greater Idra", and the second being the Idra Zuta, or "lesser Idra", with these two texts being intimately connected to each other.

The story of the Idroth is as follows:

 Idra Rabba (Zohar 3:127b-145a): R. Shimon bar Yohai convenes with nine other scholars, and they gather in the sacred אִדְרָא, or threshing field, where they thresh out secrets. Each scholar expounds various configurations of the partsufim, and three of them die in ecstasy while doing so.
 Idra Zuta (Zohar 3:287b-296d): Years later, at RASHB"I's deathbed, the seven still-living scholars come to his deathbed, along with the whole heavenly host. He alone explains the configurations of the partsufim, so this work is more unified. RASHB"I wavers between this world and the next. He directed his students to celebrate his passing that day as a Yom Hillula (wedding), as it would Messianically unite the immanent and transcendent Divine Lights of Creation. The Idra Zuta is considered the deepest teachings of the Zohar.

In the standard printed edition of the Zohar, the Idra Rabba is printed in Naso, and the Idra Zuta is printed in Ha'azinu.

Lurianic systemisation of the Partzufim
16th century Lurianic Kabbalah systemised the Zoharic Partzufim in its recasting of the whole Kabbalistic scheme. On one occasion, as recorded by Chaim Vital, Isaac Luria convened his students in the traditional location of the Idra Rabba Assembly near Meron, placing each one in the designated location of their former incarnations as the students of RASHB"I. In so doing, he identified himself with Shimon Bar Yohai.

See also
Zohar
Partzufim
Yom Hillula

References

Bibliography

 
 

Kabbalah texts
Aramaic words and phrases